Places known as Berwick-upon-Tweed include:
 the town of Berwick-upon-Tweed, within
 the local government district and borough of Berwick-upon-Tweed, within
 the parliamentary constituency of Berwick-upon-Tweed,

in the county of Northumberland, England.